Nasrabad (also Romanized as Naşrābād; also known as Nasīrābād and Nasr Abad Gheis Abad) is a village in Khusf Rural District, Central District, Khusf County, South Khorasan Province, Iran. At the 2006 census, its population was 585, in 153 families.

References 

Populated places in Khusf County